Klyapovo is a rural locality (a village) and the administrative center of Klyapovskoye Rural Settlement, Beryozovsky District, Perm Krai, Russia. The population was 505 as of 2010. There are 8 streets.

Geography 
Klyapovo is located 7 km southeast of  Beryozovka (the district's administrative centre) by road. Osinovo is the nearest rural locality.

References 

Rural localities in Beryozovsky District, Perm Krai